Hallett Motor Racing Circuit is a road course about  west of Tulsa in the Green Country of Oklahoma. The track can also be configured to run both clockwise and counter-clockwise, yielding two distinct race courses.

Hallett Motor Racing Circuit hosts their own Competition Motor Sports Association (COMMA) events, as well as SCCA events. Motorcycles and high-speed go-karts also run at Hallett.

As well as Central Motorcycle Racing Association sanctioned races, the track also hosts COMMA High Speed Touring dates where regular cars and sports cars can experience laps on the circuit under more controlled circumstances. They also provide driver education classes and a full race instruction program.

Hallett hosted the second round of seven in the SCCA's final Can-Am season.

Hallett Motor Racing Circuit has been featured in many "best tracks in America" listicles.

Lap records
The fastest official race lap records at the Hallett Motor Racing Circuit are listed as:

References

External links
Hallett Motor Racing Circuit
Trackpedia link

Motorsport venues in Oklahoma
IMSA GT Championship circuits
Buildings and structures in Pawnee County, Oklahoma
Tourist attractions in Pawnee County, Oklahoma
Sports venues completed in 1976
1976 establishments in Oklahoma